Hare & Hounds were a Welsh football and athletics club from Wrexham.

History
The club was formed around 1873, and existed during the Victorian era. Their football team played in the Welsh Cup competition during its formative years. The club was granted free use of The Racecourse Ground by Sir Watkin Williams-Wynn.

Cup History

Notable players
  John Eyton-Jones – Wales Football International.

References

Defunct football clubs in Wales
Sport in Wrexham
Sport in Wrexham County Borough
Football clubs in Wrexham